Koepenick is an unincorporated community located in the town of Upham, Langlade County, Wisconsin, United States.

History
A post office called Koepenick was established in 1890, and remained in operation until it was discontinued in 1925. The community was named for E. S. Koepenick, an early settler and owner of a local sawmill.

References

Unincorporated communities in Langlade County, Wisconsin
Unincorporated communities in Wisconsin